Pangyo-dong (판교동, 板橋洞) is neighborhood of Bundang district in the city of Seongnam, Gyeonggi Province, South Korea.

Bundang
Neighbourhoods in South Korea